The 2022 Bank of America Roval 400 was a NASCAR Cup Series race held on October 9, 2022, at Charlotte Motor Speedway in Concord, North Carolina. Contested over 112 laps -- extended from 109 laps due to an overtime finish, on the  road course, it was the 32nd race of the 2022 NASCAR Cup Series season, the sixth race of the Playoffs, and final race of the Round of 12.

Report

Background

Since 2018, deviating from past NASCAR events at Charlotte, the race will utilize a road course configuration of Charlotte Motor Speedway, promoted and trademarked as the "Roval". The race will be contested over a scheduled distance of 109 laps, .

During July 2018 tests on the road course, concerns were raised over drivers "cheating" the backstretch chicane on the course. The chicanes were modified with additional tire barriers and rumble strips in order to encourage drivers to properly drive through them, and NASCAR will enforce drive-through penalties on drivers who illegally "short-cut" parts of the course. The chicanes will not be used during restarts.  In the summer of 2019, the bus stop on the backstretch was changed and deepened, becoming a permanent part of the circuit, compared to the previous year where it was improvised.

If a driver fails to legally make the backstretch bus stop, the driver must skip the frontstretch chicane and make a complete stop by the dotted line on the exit before being allowed to continue.  A driver who misses the frontstretch chicane must stop before the exit.

Noah Gragson continued his role as a replacement for Alex Bowman in the No. 48 car after Bowman suffered from concussion-like symptoms sustained after a rear impact crash at Texas. This absence effectively eliminated Bowman from the playoffs. Additionally, due to aftereffects of his Texas wreck, Cody Ware was replaced by J. J. Yeley in No. 51 car, although Ware had competed in the Talladega race.

Entry list
 (R) denotes rookie driver.
 (i) denotes driver who is ineligible for series driver points.

Practice

Practice results

Qualifying

Qualifying results

Race

Stage Results

Stage One
Laps: 25

Stage Two
Laps: 25

Final Stage Results

Stage Three
Laps: 59

Race statistics
 Lead changes: 10 among 8 different drivers
 Cautions/Laps: 4 for 10 laps
 Red flags: 1 for 6 minutes, 10 seconds
 Time of race: 2 hours, 59 minutes and 54 seconds
 Average speed:

Penalties
Following the race, NASCAR began an investigation over Cole Custer's last lap behavior, in which he slowed down into backstretch into the chicane (on pretext of possibility of him having flat tires, according to radio communications) in order to allow Chase Briscoe to pass several drivers; NASCAR assured that the Round of 8 grid would not change as a result of the investigation. On October 11, NASCAR docked Custer 50 driver and owner points, suspended his crew chief Mike Shiplett (who made the flat tire radio communication, instead of the spotter) indefinitely, and fined both $100,000 each, on race manipulation charges. On October 27, Stewart-Haas Racing lost the appeal against Custer's penalties.

Media

Television
NBC Sports covered the race on the television side. Rick Allen, Jeff Burton, Steve Letarte and Dale Earnhardt Jr. called the race from the broadcast booth. Dave Burns, Kim Coon and Marty Snider handled the pit road duties from pit lane. Rutledge Wood served as a “CityView” reporter and share stories from the track.

Radio
The Performance Racing Network had the radio call for the race, which was also simulcasted on Sirius XM NASCAR Radio. Doug Rice and Mark Garrow called the race from the booth when the field raced down the front straightaway. IMS Radio's Nick Yeoman was assigned the entrance to the road course and into the Bank of America bridge (Turns 1-3). Voice of the Indianapolis 500 Mark Jaynes was assigned the action from the Bank of America bridge to the middle of the infield section. Doug Turnbull called the action exiting in infield into the oval Turn 1 banking (Turns 7-9).  Pat Patterson called the action on the backstretch and into the bus stop. Rob Albright was assigned to the oval Turn 3-4 end. (Turns 13-15). Brad Gillie, Brett McMillan, Alan Cavanna, and Wendy Venturini had the call from the pit area for PRN.

Standings after the race

Drivers' Championship standings

Manufacturers' Championship standings

Note: Only the first 16 positions are included for the driver standings.

References

Bank of America Roval 400
Bank of America Roval 400
NASCAR races at Charlotte Motor Speedway
Bank of America Roval 400
NASCAR controversies